Cash and Voucher Assistance (CVA) is an umbrella term for humanitarian aid programs that provide cash, or vouchers exchangeable for goods and services, directly to recipients. CVA represents an increasingly significant modality or tool in providing aid, responding to a number of factors including movement from a charity-based to a rights-based approach to aid; the increased need for cost efficiency responding to downwards trends in aid funding; and a realisation of the cost effectiveness of CVA in comparison with prior approaches.

According to The Cash Learning Partnership (CaLP), in 2019 CVA provided the mechanism by which US $5.6 billion of aid was distributed, amounting to 17.9% of total international humanitarian assistance expenditure that year.

History

The provision of aid by the transfer of cash or cash-substitutes is not novel, and can be traced back to at least 100BCE. Conditional Cash Transfers (CCT) have existed within western countries since at least the 17th century, such as the English Poor Laws. However in international humanitarian aid, the traditional approach to emergency relief has tended to be the provision of in-kind assistance. 

Hanlon et al document a paradigm shift from the early 2000s, away from paternalistic attitudes to aid giving characterised by concerns about regulation and 'good governance', towards direct funding in cash of aid recipients. As with a growth of state-funded CCT in the Global South, the evidence is suggestive of the efficacy of cash transfers to the poor, and the case for such transfers is compelling. 

In 2012, Florika Fink-Hooijer introduced cash-based aid as well as gender and age sensitive aid as part of the European Commission's Directorate-General for European Civil Protection and Humanitarian Aid Operations. 

The 2016 World Humanitarian Summit inaugurated a 'Grand Bargain' between aid funders and humanitarian organisations, committing to "get more means into the hands of people in need"; the third workstream of the bargain, led by the UK and the World Food Program is concerned with increasing the use and coordination of cash-based programming. The UN Secretary-General called for cash to be the default method of support for crisis-affected people where the situation allows.

In 2020, CaLP, a nonprofit membership organization concerned with capacity building in humanitarian cash and voucher assistance, has issued two 'state of CVA' reports, most recently in 2020. They document that the value of CVA has grown from US$2B in 2015, representing 7.9% of development aid, to US$5.6B in 2019 representing 17.9% of aid. CVA is identified by funders such as the United States Department of State and Caritas Internationalis as an effective, efficient, and appropriate method of aid; Plan International has committed to asking "why not cash?" in the design of its humanitarian responses. The UN World Food Programme, the world's largest humanitarian agency, disbursed US$3.3B in 2020 via CVA – 37% of its total assistance. The Council of the European Union in 2015 endorsed the use of cash transfers, finding "significant scope for increasing the use of multi-purpose cash-based assistance in humanitarian responses, depending on the context". The European Union, through its Directorate-General for European Civil Protection and Humanitarian Aid Operations committed to deliver 35% of humanitarian assistance in the form of cash transfers under the Grand Bargain, and has achieved an increase from 24% of the total budget in 2016 to 34% in 2019 and 2020.

In 2021, technology providers, such as through the GSMA Mobile for Humanitarian Innovation programme, have responded to the opportunity of CVA by developing partnerships with providers, and by working with the wider aid community to promulgate CVA knowledge and solutions.

Overview

Cash and Voucher Assistance is an umbrella term for a range of aid activities characterised by the transfer of cash, cash-equivalent or goods and services equivalent resources directly to aid recipients. CVA has also been called, variously, Cash Based Intervention (CBI), Cash Based Assistance (CBA) and Cash Transfer Programming (CTP).

Plan International identify a number of forms of CVA including:
cash transfers, designed to meet specific needs, but unrestricted in terms of their use - can be conditional or unconditional
multi-purpose cash transfers, designed for cover some or all of a range of household needs
value vouchers, exchangeable  for goods or services to an indicated value
commodity vouchers, exchangeable  for specified goods or services
cash for work, a conditional form of CVA requiring the recipient to perform work
cash for training, requiring the recipient to undertake training

Benefits and advantages of CVA are identified as including:
choice, dignity and flexibility - enables recipients to prioritise their own spending preferences
safety - cash can be distributed electronically, obviating the need for recipients to travel to receive aid
cost efficiency - cash can be distributed at a lower cost than goods and services
cost effectiveness - CVA can achieve better outputs and outcomes than in-kind aid
fostering economic recovery and support - CVA supports the development of sustainable local markets
financial empowerment - CVA can leverage access to additional finance resources such as seed capital
social protection - CSV can work within wider safety-nets to provide long-term support for vulnerable groups

Mechanisms for CVA include the distribution of cash in-hand; the use of a range of e-cash technologies including mobile-phone based money (mobile money), e-wallets, pre-paid debit cards, or access to money via ATM machines; and the distribution of paper or e-vouchers exchangeable for goods and services.

References

Sources

External links
CaLP - The Cash Learning Partnership - non-profit membership organisation providing a network for organisations involved in policy, practice and research in humanitarian cash and voucher assistance.
Is Cash Transfer Programming 'Fit for the Future'? - January 2014 report by the Humanitarian Futures Programme, King's College London, examining how changes in the broader global and humanitarian landscape may evolve, influence and shape CTP's future progression.

Humanitarian aid